In Egyptian mythology, Buchis (also spelt Bakh and Bakha) was the deification of the kꜣ ("power, life-force", Egyptological pronunciation ka) of the war god Montu as a sacred bull that was worshipped in the region of Hermonthis.

In order to being chosen as the Buchis incarnation of Montu, a bull was required to have a white body and black face. When these bulls – and in later times also their mothers – died, they were mummified, and placed in a special cemetery known as the Bucheum in Hermonthis.

Unlike the other Egyptian sacred bulls – the Apis and the Mnevis – the Buchis cult started towards the end of the pharaonic period, with the earliest known burial taking place in regnal year 14 of Nectanebo II (mid 4th century BC). However, four different bull cults dedicated to Montu were known in earlier times in Upper Egypt, and it seems that the Buchis was the result of their syncretism. Eventually, the Buchis bull was identified as a form of the Apis, and consequently became considered an incarnation of Osiris.

Sources disagree about when the last burial of a Buchis took place. It may have happened either in regnal year 12 of Diocletian or further later, in 340 CE.

References

External links

 Epitaphs of Buchis bulls 
 The last funerary stela of a Buchis bull
 British Museum object page with information about Buchis

Egyptian mythology
Mythological bulls
Sacred bulls